Ereleuva (born before AD 440, died c. 500?) was the mother of the Ostrogothic king Theoderic the Great. She is often referred to as the concubine of Theoderic's father, Theodemir, although  that Gelasius refers to her as regina ("queen") suggests that she had a prominent social position despite the informality of her union with Theodemir.

Ereleuva was Christian, and was baptised with the name Eusebia. She had probably converted from Arianism as an adult, but the details are unclear in the historical record. Ereleuva is regarded as having taken to Christianity quite seriously, as indicated by her correspondence with Pope Gelasius I and mention of her in Ennodius's Panegyric of Theoderic.

Her name was variously spelled by historians in antiquity as Ereriliva (by the fragmentary chronicle of  Anonymus Valesianus, c. 527) and Erelieva (by Jordanes), and is now largely known to modern historians as Ereleuva, as she was addressed most frequently by Pope Gelasius I.

References

5th-century births
6th-century deaths
Converts to Catholicism from Arianism
Ostrogothic queens consort
5th-century Christians
5th-century Ostrogothic people
Year of birth uncertain
5th-century women